Indian rolling (or Injun rollin') is the assault, and in some cases murder, of Navajo and Apache, often of homeless individuals, committed by non-Indians in the Southwestern United States, particularly in the border towns surrounding the Navajo Nation and Jicarilla lands.
In her 2006 dissertation, Lisa Donaldson classifies Indian rolling as a "thrill-seeking hate crime" and traces its roots to the colonization of the Southwest which created a "power differential between groups that led to negative feelings toward minorities among law enforcement and local citizens".

The assaults, which often target alcoholic men who are comparatively defenseless, are variously described as representing  "rites of passage", "sport", and a "recreational pastime" to the perpetrators. 
Survivors report the act involves being assaulted with rocks, pellet guns, bottles, eggs, and baseball bats. Victims claim, furthermore, that law enforcement officials often refuse to intervene.

The term first came to public notoriety in the spring of 1974 when three Navajos were beaten and murdered by white teenagers in the city of Farmington, New Mexico, and their mutilated bodies were subsequently found in a nearby canyon. The perpetrators were not convicted of murder but were sent to a reform school. Subsequent protests by tribal members turned into riots when permits to march peacefully were revoked or not granted. The incident triggered a report by the New Mexico Advisory Committee to the United States Commission on Civil Rights and inspired the true crime-novel The Broken Circle—A True Story of Murder and Magic in Indian Country by Rodney Barker.

Concerns about the practice's revival emerged in the 1970s to 2000s after a resurgence of attacks against Native Americans in the area. Assaults have allegedly taken place in Flagstaff, Phoenix, Page and Gallup.

See also
Hate crime
Lynching
Saskatoon freezing deaths
Police brutality against Native Americans
Missing and Murdered Indigenous Women

References

External links
The Farmington Report: A Conflict of Cultures. New Mexico Advisory Committee to the United States Commission on Civil Rights. 1975.

American phraseology
Euphemisms
Hate crime
Anti-indigenous racism in the United States
Navajo history
Native American topics
Violence against indigenous peoples
Alcohol and Native Americans